Hamideh Kheirabadi (21 December 1924 – 19 April 2010) was an Iranian film and theatre actress. She played in more than 200 feature films and in over 20 television series. In Iran, she is affectionately referred to as Nādereh and Mother of the Iranian Cinema.

Life and career
Hamideh Kheirabadi was born in Rasht, the capital of the Gilan Province, Iran. Whereas she married at the very young age of 13, she continued with her studies and completed her secondary-school education. In the middle of the 1950s she divorced from her husband and lived thereafter with her daughter, Soraya Ghasemi (born 1940). Kheirabadi's acting career began in 1947 with theatre.

Hamideh Kheirabadi worked with a large number of celebrated Iranian film directors, such as Ali Hatami, Dariush Mehrjoui, Masud Kimiai, Mohsen Makhmalbaf, Sirus Alvand, Sirus Moghaddam and Tahmineh Milani. She was thrice nominated for the Crystal Simorgh Prize. During the second Iranian Celebration of Screen Actors, held on 5 January 2008 at Tehran's Arikeh-ye Iranian Hall, Kheirābādi was honoured with a Lifetime Achievement Award.

It has been reported that plans had been made that after six years of absence from acting, Kheirabadi would appear before camera on 23 April 2010, playing the role of herself in a series named The Land of the People (Zamin-e Ensān-hā), directed by Abolhasan Dāvoudi.

Hamideh Kheirābādi died at her home in Tehran on Monday night, 19 April 2010, at the age of 86. The cause for her death has been given as brain stroke. Ms Kheirābādi was buried in Section 66 of Behesht-e Zahra Cemetery in Tehran, on Tuesday 20 April 2010.

Filmography 
A very extensive filmography of Hamideh Kheirabadi can be found on the Gilaki Wikipedia. At present a less extensive filmography of Hamideh Kheirābādi is available at the Persian Wikipedia. What follows is only a selected filmography.

Feature films 
 Amir Arsalān-e Nāmdār (Amir Arsalān the Great), 1955, directed by Shāpour Yāsami.
 Almās 33 (Diamond 33), 1967, directed by Dariush Mehrjoui
Reza Motorcyclist (Reza Motori) (1970) - directed by Masoud Kimiai
Wood Pigeon (Toghi) (1970) - directed by Ali Hatami
 Bābā Shamal (Bābā Shamal), 1971, directed by Ali Hatami
 Mehdi in Black and Hot Mini Pants, 1972
 Shab-e Aftābi (The Sunny Night), 1977, directed by Sirus Alvand
 Ejāreh-neshin-hā (The Tenants), 1986, directed by Dariush Mehrjoui
 Mādar (Mother), 1989, directed by Ali Hatami
 Bach'che'hā-ye Talāgh (The Children of Divorce), 1989, directed by Tahmineh Milani
 Bānu (The Lady), 1991, directed by Dariush Mehrjoui
 Honarpisheh (The Actor), 1992, directed by Mohsen Makhmalbaf
 Soroud-e Tavallod (The Birthday-song), 2004, directed by Ali Ghavitan

Television series 
 Pedar Salar (The Paternalist), 1993, directed by Akbar Khājavi
 Khaneh Sabz (The Green Home), 1996, directed by Bijan Birang and Masoud Rassām

See also 
 Cinema of Iran

References

External links 
 Filmography at irancinema.ir
 
 Mother of Iranian cinema Hamideh Kheirabadi dies at 86, Tehran Times, Wednesday 21 April 2010: .
 Some photographs, published by Iranian Students' News Agency, ISNA, taken in Behesht-e Zahra cemetery on Tuesday 20 April 2010: (1), (2), (3). Photograph (1) shows the graveside immediately after the burial. Photograph (2) shows Sorayyā Ghāsemi (r) in conversation with Ali Nasirian (l); the person in the middle is not identified. Photograph (3) shows the graveside of Ms Hamideh Kheirābādi, with Ali Nasirian sitting on the right.
 A photo-reportage, by Fars News Agency, of the memorial service of Ms Hamideh Kheirābādi, held in Vali-yye Asr Mosque in Tehran, on Thursday 22 April 2010: .

1924 births
2010 deaths
People from Rasht
People from Tehran
Iranian film actresses
Iranian stage actresses
Burials at Behesht-e Zahra
Iranian television actresses
20th-century Iranian actresses